Bridge is the sixth studio album by American jam band Blues Traveler, released in May 2001. The record is the band's first since the 1999 death of original bassist, Bobby Sheehan, and the first to include new members Tad Kinchla and Ben Wilson on bass and keyboards, respectively.

The original title for the album was Bridge Out of Brooklyn.

Track listing
All tracks by Blues Traveler

 "Back in the Day" – 4:01
 "Girl Inside My Head" – 3:36
 "Rage" – 6:07
 "Just for Me" – 3:04
 "You Reach Me" – 4:27
 "All Hands" – 5:06
 "Pretty Angry (for J. Sheehan)" – 6:59
 "The Way" – 4:38
 "You Lost Me There" – 4:09
 "Sadly a Fiction" – 4:16
 "You're Burning Me" – 2:44
 "Decision of the Skies" – 4:27

Personnel
 John Popper – vocals, harmonica
 Brendan Hill – drums, percussion
 Chan Kinchla – guitars
 Tad Kinchla – bass
 Ben Wilson – keyboards
 Warren Haynes – slide guitar

References

External links
 

2001 albums
Blues Traveler albums
Albums produced by Matt Wallace
Interscope Records albums